Athinaikos H.C. is a Greek handball club based in Vyronas, Athens. The club is the handball section of Greek multisport club of Athinaikos. It is one of the most successful Greek handball club with titles both Men's and Women's team.

History
Athinaikos is one of the first clubs competed in the championship that was founded in the late of 1970s. Athinaikos won one Men's Championship and three Men's cups, two of them was consecutive, as well as two women's championships and three women's cups. Men's team of Athinaikos played three times in EHF Competitions and women's team played four times in Women's EHF Competitions. Despite the successful presence, Athinaikos was withdrawn from championship in 2006 due to financial problems. The club remained inactive for 9 years and returned in 2015-16 season playing in Beta Ethniki championship (3rd tier).

Recent Seasons (Men's team)

Honours and achievements
Men's Team
Greek Men's Handball Championship
Winner (1): 2005
Greek Men's Handball Cup
Winner (3): 1997, 2005, 2006
Women's Team
Greek Women's Handball Championship
Winner (2): 1987, 1988
Greek Women's Handball Cup
Winner (3): 1988, 1995, 1997

References

External links
 Eurohandball, Men's Team
Eurohandball, Women's Team 

Greek handball clubs
Athinaikos A.C.